The 2022–23 Adelaide Strikers season was the twelfth in the club's history. The team was coached by Jason Gillespie and captained by Travis Head, they competed in the BBL's 2021–22 season.

Standings

Regular season

Season statistics

Batting

Bowling

Current squad
The current squad of the Adelaide Strikers for the 2022–23 Big Bash League season as of 6 December 2022.
 Players with international caps are listed in bold
 Ages are given as of the opening match of the tournament, 13 December 2022
  denotes a player who is currently unavailable for selection.
  denotes a player who is unavailable for rest of the season.

Notes

References

Adelaide Strikers seasons
2022–23 Australian cricket season